"Birdland" is a jazz/pop song written by Joe Zawinul of the band Weather Report as a tribute to the Birdland nightclub in New York City, which appeared on the band's 1977 album Heavy Weather. The Manhattan Transfer won a Grammy Award with their 1979 version of the song, which had lyrics by Jon Hendricks. Quincy Jones won two Grammy Awards for the version of the piece he included on his 1989 album Back on the Block. The leading Cuban band Los Van Van included an extended interpolation of the piece in their song Tim Pop/Birdland.

History 
"Birdland" marked the peak of Weather Report's commercial career with the release of Heavy Weather.  "Birdland" served as a tribute to the famous New York City jazz club that hosted many famous jazz musicians, which operated on Broadway from 1949 through 1965.  This was the club, which he frequented almost daily, where Zawinul heard Count Basie, Louis Armstrong, Duke Ellington, and Miles Davis.  It was also where he met his wife, Maxine.  Looking back, Zawinul claimed, "The old Birdland was the most important place in my life."  The song was also named in honor of Charlie Parker. According to Jaco Pastorius in a 1978 interview, the studio version featured on Heavy Weather was recorded in just one take.

The Penguin Guide to Jazz Recordings comments that “Birdland” typifies the formula that made the band successful, and “is one of only a handful of contemporary jazz tunes that everyone seems to have heard.”

Personnel 
 Joe Zawinul – Yamaha grand piano, ARP 2600 and Oberheim polyphonic synthesizer, melodica, vocals
 Wayne Shorter – soprano and tenor saxophones
 Jaco Pastorius – fretless bass, mandocello, vocals
 Manolo Badrena – tambourine
 Alex Acuña – drums

Awards and honors
The Weather Report recording was inducted into the Grammy Hall of Fame, in 2010.

See also
 Maynard Ferguson
 Buddy Rich
 Quincy Jones

References 

1977 compositions
Jazz fusion compositions
1970s jazz standards
Smooth jazz songs
Grammy Hall of Fame Award recipients
Jazz compositions in F major
Grammy Award for Best Vocal Arrangement for Two or More Voices
Songs with lyrics by Jon Hendricks